LSJ is the common name of reference for A Greek-English Lexicon, from its editors, Liddell-Scott-Jones.

LSJ may also refer to:
LSJ, a type of GM engine
Lansing State Journal, a daily newspaper in Lansing, Michigan
London School of Journalism
Lsj (Sverker Johansson), creator of Lsjbot